Syrian people or Syrians are the majority inhabitants or citizens of the Syrian Arab Republic.

Syrian may also refer to:

People 
 Syrian diaspora, Syrian emigrants and their descendants living outside of Syria, as either immigrants or refugees
 Native inhabitants of the historical region of Syria
 Adherents of Syriac Christianity
 Assyrian people, an ethnic group indigenous to Assyria, in the Middle East
 Arameans, an ancient Semitic-speaking people formerly in the Near East

Individuals 
 Ephrem the Syrian (306–373), prominent Christian theologian and writer
 Michael the Syrian (died 1199), a patriarch of the Syriac Orthodox Church from 1166 to 1199
 Rezon the Syrian, an enemy of King Solomon mentioned in 1 Kings

Other uses 
 Syrian (band), an Italian synthpop band
 Syrian (horse) or Arabian horse, a breed of horse
 Syrian Air, a Syrian airline

See also 
 
 
 Syrian language (disambiguation)
 Syrian Catholic (disambiguation)
 Syria (disambiguation)
 Syriac (disambiguation)
 Assyrian (disambiguation)
 Sirian (disambiguation)
 Cerean (disambiguation)
 Syrian Arabic, Arabic varieties spoken in Syria
 Levantine Arabic, a sprachbund of modern spoken Arabic in the Levant